is a railway station in the city of Yonezawa, Yamagata Prefecture, Japan, operated by East Japan Railway Company (JR East).

Lines
Narushima Station is served by the Yonesaka Line, and is located 9.6 rail kilometers from the terminus of the line at Yonezawa Station.

Station layout
The station has a single ground-level side platform serving a single bi-directional line. The station building is a shelter built directly on the platform. The station is unattended.

History
Narushima Station opened on 7 July 1961. The station was absorbed into the JR East network upon the privatization of JNR on 1 April 1987.

Surrounding area
 
Dai Roku Middle School
Hirohata Elementary School

See also
List of Railway Stations in Japan

External links

 JR East Station information 

Railway stations in Yamagata Prefecture
Yonesaka Line
Railway stations in Japan opened in 1961
Stations of East Japan Railway Company
Yonezawa, Yamagata